The 3rd Mounted Division was a Yeomanry Division of the British Army active during World War I.  It was formed on 6 March 1915 as the 2/2nd Mounted Division, a replacement/depot formation for the 2nd Mounted Division which was being sent abroad on active service.  In March 1916, it was renumbered as the 3rd Mounted Division and in July 1916 as the 1st Mounted Division.  In September 1917, the division was reorganized as a cyclist formation and redesignated as The Cyclist Division.  It remained in the United Kingdom throughout the war and was disbanded in June 1919.

History

2/2nd Mounted Division
In accordance with the Territorial and Reserve Forces Act 1907 (7 Edw. 7, c.9) which brought the Territorial Force into being, the TF was intended to be a home defence force for service during wartime and members could not be compelled to serve outside the country. However, on the outbreak of war on 4 August 1914, many members volunteered for Imperial Service.  Therefore, TF units were split into 1st Line (liable for overseas service) and 2nd Line (home service for those unable or unwilling to serve overseas) units.  2nd Line units performed the home defence role, although in fact most of these were also posted abroad in due course.  Likewise, existing pre-war formations (brigades and divisions) formed duplicate 2nd Lines with the same structure as their 1st Line parents.

On 2 September 1914, the 2nd Mounted Division was formed in and around the Churn area of Berkshire with the 1st South Midland, 2nd South Midland, Nottinghamshire and Derbyshire, and London Mounted Brigades.  In November 1914, the division moved to Norfolk on coastal defence duties and in March 1915 the division was put on warning for overseas service.

Consequently, the 2/2nd Mounted Division was formed on 6 March 1915 to replace the 2nd Mounted Division and took over the home defence role of guarding the Norfolk coast against a possible invasion.  It comprised the 2nd Line formations of all units in the 2nd Mounted Division so 2/1st South Midland, 2/2nd South Midland, 2/1st Nottinghamshire and Derbyshire, and 2/1st London Mounted Brigades.

Each 2nd Line unit formed at their original depots and were scattered across London and the Midlands.  They had to assemble on the East Coast to form the division.  Once assembled, divisional headquarters was at King's Lynn and the brigades at Narborough, Hunstanton, King's Lynn, and Aylsham.  Once assembled, it was assigned to the First Army (Home Forces) and was responsible for the defence of the East Coast.  In common with the other 2nd Line divisions, the division experienced considerable problems with regard to equipment.  Although relatively strong in manpower (the yeomanry regiments had between 410 and 498 men, three of the Royal Horse Artillery batteries averaged over 200, one only had 91), the division was short of horses (one regiment had just 5, another 99), rifles (the most that any regiment had was 206), and other equipment.

At first, rather than growing in size, the division shrunk as men were drafted off to active units overseas. The division also suffered lack of equipment; the artillery batteries were issued with the older 15 pounder Breech Loading Converted rather than the 15 pounder Quick Firing gun that was the standard weapon of first line TF RHA units. There was also a lack of Lee–Enfield rifles, and some soldiers had Japanese-made carbines instead.

3rd Mounted Division
On 20 March 1916, the 2/2nd Mounted Division was renumbered as the 3rd Mounted Division on the same date that the 4th Mounted Division was formed.  The brigades were numbered on 31 March; the division now commanded the 9th, 10th, 11th, and 12th Mounted Brigades and the other support units (signals, medical, supply) were numbered accordingly.

1st Mounted Division
In July 1916 there was a major reorganization of 2nd Line yeomanry units in the United Kingdom.  All but 12 regiments were converted to cyclists: the rest were dismounted, handed over their horses to the remount depots and were issued with bicycles.  The 1st Mounted Division was converted to 1st Cyclist Division and the 4th Mounted Division to 2nd Cyclist Division.  At the same time, the 3rd Mounted Division was renumbered as the 1st Mounted Division as it was the only remaining mounted division: the other mounted division, 2nd Mounted Division, had been broken up in Egypt on 21 January 1916.  At this time the division was reorganized.  It now consisted of three mounted brigades (1st, 2nd, and 3rd) and a cyclist brigade (9th) and once again the support units were renumbered.

At this time, the division was assigned to General Reserve, Home Defence Troops.  The headquarters was at Brentwood, Essex along with two of the mounted brigades; the third was near Maidstone, and the cyclist brigade at Bridge, Bishopsbourne, and Bekesbourne (all in Kent). In October, the brigade at Maidstone moved to West Malling and the cyclists were concentrated at Bridge.  In November, the cyclist brigade was renumbered as the 5th Cyclist Brigade.

In May 1917, divisional headquarters moved to Sevenoaks and the brigades were at Brentwood, West Malling, Sevenoaks and Bridge (the cyclist brigade).

The Cyclist Division
In mid August 1917, the division was issued with bicycles; from now on it would be the training and draft-finding formation for overseas cyclist units and the Army Cyclist Corps.  All trained cavalrymen were transferred to the Reserve Cavalry Regiments.  On 4 September 1917 the division was renamed again, this time as The Cyclist Division and the mounted brigades redesignated as the 11th, 12th and 13th Cyclist Brigades.  The 5th Cyclist brigade became independent, but rejoined the division in December when the 13th Cyclist Brigade was broken up.

In March 1918, the headquarters and two of the brigades were at Canterbury and the other at Littlebourne, Ash, and Wingham as part of the Independent Force, Home Defence Troops.  By the end of the war in November 1918, the division was concentrated at Canterbury.

Disbandment of the division started in March 1919 and was complete by June.  Throughout its existence, from March 1915, the division remained in the England on Home Defence duties.

Orders of battle

Commanders
The 2/2nd Mounted Division / 3rd Mounted Division / 1st Mounted Division / The Cyclist Division had the following commanders:

See also

 List of British divisions in World War I
 British yeomanry during the First World War
 Second line yeomanry regiments of the British Army

Notes

References

Bibliography
 
 
 
 Graham E. Watson & Richard A. Rinaldi, The Corps of Royal Engineers: Organization and Units 1889–2018, Tiger Lily Books, 2018, .

3
3
Military units and formations established in 1915
Military units and formations disestablished in 1919
1915 establishments in England